Arthur Goldschmidt Jr. is a historian of Egypt and professor emeritus of Middle East history at Pennsylvania State University.

Selected publications

Articles and chapters
 “The Egyptian Nationalist Party, 1892–1919” in Political and Social Change in Modern Egypt, edited by P.M. Holt (Oxford University Press, 1968)
 “The Leader Muhammad Farid as Viewed by a Foreign Historian” (in Arabic), al-Musawwar, 14 November 1969
 “Historical Perspectives,” in The Middle East: Its Government and Politics, edited by Abid A. Al-Marayati and others (Duxbury Press, 1972)
 “Egyptian National Party from Spotlight to Shadow,” Journal of Asian and African Studies 16 (1982)
 “The 1906 Taba Affair,” al-Abhath 35 (1986)
 “Van Dyck, Cornelius” in American National Biography (1999)
 “Egypt’s 1952 Revolution” and “The United Arab Republic” in History in Dispute.

Books
 A Concise History of the Middle East (Westview Press, 1979, 1983, 1988, 1991, 1996, 1999, 2002, 2006 with Lawrence Davidson; AUC Press, 1983, 2004)
 Modern Egypt: The Formation of a Nation-State (Westview Press, 1988, 2004)
 Memoirs and Diaries of Muhammad Farid, an Egyptian Nationalist Leader (1868–1919) (Edwin Mellen Press, 1992)
 Historical Dictionary of Egypt, 2nd ed. (Scarecrow Press, 1994); 3rd ed. with Robert Johnston (Scarecrow Press, 2003; AUC Press, 2004)
 71 entries in Encyclopedia of the Modern Middle East (Macmillan, 1996, 2004)
 Biographical Dictionary of Modern Egypt (Lynne Rienner Publishers, 2000)
 History chapter in Understanding the Contemporary Middle East, edited by Deborah Gerner (Lynne Rienner Publishers, 2000, revised 2003, revised 2008)
 Editor and contributor, Re-Envisioning Egypt, 1919–1952 (AUC Press, 2005)
 Brief History of Egypt (Facts on File, 2008)
 Series editor, Creation of the Modern Middle East Series (Chelsea House, 2008)

References

External links 
Dr. G: Curriculum Vitae

 

Living people
Year of birth missing (living people)
Historians of Egypt
Pennsylvania State University faculty